Karazhensky is a rural locality (a khutor) in Kletskoye Rural Settlement, Kletsky District, Volgograd Oblast, Russia. The population was 228 as of 2010. There are 4 streets.

Geography 
Karazhensky is located 4 km northwest of Kletskaya (the district's administrative centre) by road. Podnizhny is the nearest rural locality.

References 

Rural localities in Kletsky District